The Rappbode Auxiliary Dam is one of the two auxiliary dams in the Rappbode Dam system. This is the heart of the Rappbode Dam system in the East Harz, which is operated by the Saxony-Anhalt Dam Company (Talsperrenbetrieb des Landes Sachsen-Anhalt) and which also includes the Hassel Auxiliary Dam and the Königshütte, Mandelholz and Wendefurth dams.

The Rappbode Auxiliary Dam near Trautenstein is used, together with the main dam, for supplying drinking water and for flood protection.
The auxiliary dam impounds the River Rappbode. It has a 25 m high gravity dam.

The area around the Rappbode Auxiliary Dam is well-suited to walking. Its eastern shore is dominated by numerous rocky crags. On the most important lakeside rocks, where today the reservoir and, formerly, the Rappbode river makes a small bend, there was once a castle, the Trageburg, which, like the Susenburg not far away, was used to guard an old long-distance trade route.

Gallery

See also 
 List of dams in the Harz
 List of reservoirs and dams in Germany

External links 
 The Rappbode Auxiliary Dam ('Predam') 
 Saxony-Anhalt Dam Company 

Dams in the Harz
Dams in Saxony-Anhalt
Dams completed in 1961